Microplontus is a genus of beetles belonging to the family Curculionidae.

he species of this genus are found in Europe.

Species:
 Microplontus amurensis Korotyaev, 2004 
 Microplontus fairmairii (Brisout de Barneville, 1881)

References

Curculionidae
Curculionidae genera